Lithosia taishanica is a moth of the family Erebidae. It was described by Franz Daniel in 1954. It is found in Shandong, China.

References

 

Lithosiina
Moths described in 1954
Moths of Asia